The Registrary is the senior administrative officer of the University of Cambridge. The term is unique to Cambridge, and uses an archaic spelling. Most universities in the United Kingdom and in North America have administrative offices entitled "registrar" or "the registry", although typically with substantially less official responsibility than the Cambridge post.

At Cambridge, the Registrary is also Secretary to the University Council.  As the head of the university's Unified Administrative Service, the Registrary is responsible for the central management and the non-academic services of the university.  The Registrary has control of the University Chest (formerly a physical chest in which the funds of the university were held secure, now a metaphor for the university's bank accounts). The actual chest is still kept in the Registrary's office. It is over 600 years old and is locked with 17 locks. The previous chest was burned in the Cambridge Peasants' Revolt of 1381. Until the 14th century, the university's books were also kept in the chest.

The office of the Registrary was established in 1506, to compile and maintain the records of the university.  The office has been held by only 26 persons in continuous succession since that date. Many early registraries held, or had held, the office of Esquire Bedell. The current Registrary is Emma Rampton, who took office in October 2017.

List of Registraries 

 1506 Robert Hobbs (Hobys)
 1543 John Mere
 1558 Matthew Stokys (Stokes)
 1591 Thomas Smith
 1600 James Tabor
 1645 Matthew Whinn
 1683 James Halman
 1701 Robert Grove
 1725 Lancelot Newton
 1734 John Taylor
 1751 Lynford Caryl
 1758 Henry Hubbard
 1778 George Borlase
 1809 William Augustus Pemberton
 1816 William Hustler
 1832 Joseph Romilly
 1862 Henry Richards Luard
 1891 John Willis Clark
 1910 John Neville Keynes
 1925 Ernest Harrison
 1943 Walter Wyatt Grave
 1953 Robert Mantle Rattenbury
 1969 Roderick Ewen Macpherson
 1983 Stephen George Fleet
 1997 Timothy John Mead
 2007 Jonathan Nicholls
 2017 Emma Rampton

Subordinate posts
The office of Assistant Registrary was established in 1885, and was until 1926 was a fixed term appointment of three years. A Second Assistant Registrary was added in 1920, and a Third Assistant in 1921. In April 1961 the posts were renamed as Deputy Registrary and Deputy Secretary General, Senior Assistant Registrary, and Assistant Registrary.

See also
Registrar of the University of Oxford

References

External links
 

1506 establishments in England
Registraries of the University of Cambridge